Annik Houel (born 18 June 1943 in Saint-Marcellin) is a French psychologist and feminist. She is honorary professor in social psychology at the University Lumière Lyon 2. She is a member of the National Association for Feminist Studies (ANEF), which she chaired for several years. She was co-founder of the Center Louise Labé. She is one of the pioneers of teaching on gender issues in France, along with Huguette Bouchardeau,

Life 
,Annik Houel was born on 18 June 1943 in Saint-Marcellin. Her mother, originally a worker then later a building manager, and her father, a sales executive, settled in Paris in 1945, then moved to Le Pecq in 1957. They encouraged the studies of Annik Houel, their only daughter, who obtained his degree in psychology at the Sorbonne in 1966 while studying sociology.

In 1967, she began a thesis under the direction of Roger Daval then Jean Bergeret, Modes of interiorization of a cultural model: the maternal role through the experience of induced abortion, for which she received a research for two years. She studied at and became an activist during these years at the University of Paris I. She was close to the Trotskyists circles, then to Socialisme ou barbarie. She met feminist activists there such as Évelyne Sullerot and Geneviève Texier. She also joined the French Association of Women University Graduates (AFFDU), which brought together female students from all over the world.

From 1967 to 1968, her Family Planning work, enabled her to carry out interviews with women from the Assistance Publique and to show  the harm of prohibition on the physical and psychological health of women, in a comparison with the situation in Switzerland, where abortion was then legal,. In 1971, Geneviève Texier asked her to co-author with another young researcher, Michèle Alabounette, her first scientific article. At the time, Annik Houel was planning to become a business psychologist and obtained a professional diploma for this purpose in 1969. The abundance of university positions made her change her mind: she moved to Lyon in September 1969 as an assistant professor at Lyon 2 University. While pursuing her thesis, she became involved in the Lyon branch of the Movement for the Freedom of Abortion and Contraception (MLAC). She created a "women's group", which, in 1975 was constituted in a self-managed feminist association, "Centre des femmes", which she chaired until its closure in 1980. In 1976, she participated in the creation at the University of the Lyon Center for Feminist Studies (CLEF)3, alongside Huguette Bouchardeau and Brigitte Lhomond, and then Patricia Mercader and Helga Sobota. The CLEF has a documentation center and holds interdisciplinary seminars; it combines university activities and activism.

In parallel with her militant activity, Anne Houel defended her thesis in 1976 and became assistant professor in 1978 then lecturer in 1986. With Huguette Bouchardeau, both teachers in the psychology unit of the University Lumière Lyon, they provide the first courses on gender issues, “Sex and gender – Masculine/Feminine”. Initially frowned upon by the university, they ended up, after a phase of relative indifference, obtaining its support.

In 1989, she joined the National Association for Feminist Studies (ANEF), then in its infancy, which she chaired from 1998 to 2004.

In 1992, Annik Houel defended a thesis, From the lover to the mother: a female quest, at the University of Paris-Diderot, under the direction of Michèle Huguet. She was qualified by the National Council of Universities (CNU) as a university professor in 1993.

She then founded and directed the Laboratory of Social Psychology, recognized as a Reception Team (EA 4163), under the name of GREPS (Research Group in Social Psychology, and to which the CLEF could lean more solidly, renamed Center in 2003 Louise Labé, as part of the Gender Equality Mission carried out by Annik Houel from 2003 to 2006 at Lyon 2 University. It receives support from the European Social Fund.

Annick Houel retired in 2008. She is an honorary professor of social psychology at Lyon 29 University. She was part of the team mobilized for the National Survey on Violence Against Women in France (ENVFF), and She continues to actively campaign within the National Solidarity Women Federation, in particular being vice-president of the VIFFIL association (Violences Intrafamiliales Femmes Informations Liberté), located in Villeurbanne (69100). She also continues to study the mother-daughter relationship.

Works 

 Le mouvement de libération des femmes : Lyon 1970-1980, Lyon, Centre lyonnais d'études féministes, 1987, 279 p.
 Annik Houel, ed. Bibliothèque du féminisme, l'Harmattan, 1997, 158 p. (
 Annik Houel, Armand Colin, eds. Renouveaux en psychanalyse, 1999, 175 p.
 Annik Houel, Michelle Zancarini-Fournel et al. eds., Cahiers Masculin/féminin, Lyon, Presses universitaires de Lyon,  2001
 Annik Houel, Patricia Mercader et Helga Sobota, Crime passionnel, crime ordinaire, Paris, Presses universitaires de France, 2003, 190 p. (BNF 38975792)
 Maryse Jaspart et al., ed. Les violences envers les femmes en France : une enquête nationale, La Documentation Française, 2003, 374 p.
 Annik Houel, Patricia Mercader et Helga Sobota, Psychosociologie du crime passionnel : à la vie, à la mort, Presses universitaires de France, 2008, 233 p.
 Annik Houel, Paris, Odile Jacob, Rivalités féminines au travail : l'influence de la relation mère-fille, Paris, 2014, 167 p.
 Claire Auzias et Annik Houel, Lyon, Atelier de création libertaire, 2016, 1982), 180 p.

References 

1943 births
Living people
French women psychologists
French women academics
French feminists
People from Saint-Marcellin, Isère